Astrothelium subscoria is a species of corticolous (bark-dwelling) lichen in the family Trypetheliaceae. Found in Bolivia, it was formally described as a new species in 2016 by lichenologists Adam Flakus and André Aptroot. It is only known to occur at the type locality. The species epithet refers to its resemblance to Astrothelium scoria, from which it differs in having in having non-aggregated ascomata.

References

subscoria
Lichen species
Lichens described in 2016
Lichens of Bolivia
Taxa named by André Aptroot
Taxa named by Adam Grzegorz Flakus